Al Fateh Sports Club is a Saudi Arabian multi-sports club based in Al-Mubarraz, Al-Ahsa. It is mainly known for its professional football club. The club derives its nickname, "Al-Namothaji" (The Paragon), from the fact that almost all of the club's sports play in the national top flights.

History 
Al Fateh have played in the lower divisions for most of their existence, unlike rivals and city neighbours Hajer FC who played in the top flight when they achieved promotions in the 80's, 90's and 2000's. Al Fateh hired Tunisian head coach Fathi Al-Jabal in the middle of the 2007-08 Saudi First Division League, in the 2008-09 season Al-Jabal finished as runners-up to guide Al Fateh to their first ever promotion to the Saudi Professional League. The club managed to stay up in the Saudi Professional League in their first ever top flight season. In the following two seasons the club set out to build a formidable squad, with Al Fateh already possessing talented home grown players such as Hamdan Al-Hamdan and Mohammed Al-Fuhaid, they also acquired the services of Congolese forward Doris Fuakumputu and former Al-Nasser Attacking midfielder Élton.

Saudi League Champions (2012–2013) 
Al Fateh pulled off a surprise when on 14 April 2013, they won their first League title, with 2 games to spare, following a 1–0 home win over Al-Ahli. Al Fateh became the seventh club to win the Pro League. This is considered by many to be one of the greatest shocks in Saudi football history, especially considering that Al Fateh were promoted to the Pro League for the first time only four years earlier. This was the first time a club outside the Riyadh and Jeddah clubs to win the Saudi Professional League since the 1986–87 season. Élton won the Player of the Season award by scoring 11 goals and bagging 10 assists, as well as Doris Fuakumputu scoring 17 goals to lead Al Fateh to the title.

Later, they played in the inaugural edition of the Saudi Super Cup to face Al-Ittihad, after 90 minutes the score was a 2-2 draw and the game went into extra time. Élton scored the winning goal of the game in the 111th minute, Al Fateh defeated Al-Ittihad 3–2 after extra time to become the inaugural champions of the Saudi Super Cup.

Al Fateh advanced to the 2014 AFC Champions League group stage in their debut campaign as 2012–13 Saudi Professional League champions, but crashed out of the group stage with a (2D,4L) record and without winning a single match. Al Fateh qualified again to the 2017 AFC Champions League due to Al-Ittihad, the 2015–16 Saudi Professional League 3rd place, could not participate in the AFC Champions League because of club licensing requirements problems. As a result, Al Taawoun, the league 4th place, entered the group stage instead of the qualifying play-offs, while Al Fateh, the league 5th place, entered the qualifying play-offs. Al Fateh defeated Nasaf Qarshi 1-0 in the Qualifying play-offs to advance to the group stage (Group B).

Honours

League
Saudi Professional League (Level 1)
Winners (1): 2012–13
Saudi First Division (Level 2)
Runners-up (1): 2008-09
Second Division (Level 3)
Winners (3): 1982–83, 1996–97, 1998–99
Runners-up (1): 2002–03

Cup
Saudi Super Cup
Winners (1): 2013

Current squad

As of Saudi Professional League:

Unregistered players

Out on loan

International competitions

Overview

International record

Matches

Managers
 Ahmed Al-Saud (1997 – 1998)
 Moustafa Younis (1998 – 1999)
 Hocine Belhassen (July 1, 1999 – December 15, 2000)
 Senad Kreso (December 15, 2000 – August 1, 2001)
 Faruk Jusić (September 5, 2001 – December 30, 2001)
 Ahmed Al-Saud (caretaker) (December 30, 2001 – January 21, 2002)
 Ali Boushlaibi (January 21, 2002 – May 30, 2002)
 Mondher Ladhari (July 1, 2002 – May 30, 2004)
 Fahad Al-Shurfa (caretaker) (July 12, 2004 – September 6, 2004)
 Zouhair Louati (September 6, 2004 – May 30, 2005)
 Najib Hemimo (August 1, 2005 – November 1, 2005)
 Ali Bo Saleh (caretaker) (November 1, 2005 – December 23, 2005)
 Rachid Ben Ammar (December 23, 2005 – March 6, 2006)
 Bahaaeddine Qebisi (March 9, 2006 – January 12, 2007)
 Ali Bo Saleh (caretaker) (January 12, 2007 – February 2, 2007)
 Omar Meziane (February 2, 2007 – June 1, 2007)
 Senad Kreso (July 31, 2007 – December 31, 2007)
 Yousef Al-Sarouj (caretaker) (December 31, 2007 – January 24, 2008)
 Fathi Al-Jabal (January 24, 2008 – May 26, 2014)
 Juan José Maqueda (May 27, 2014 – September 25, 2014)
 Nacif Beyaoui (October 1, 2014 – May 29, 2016)
 Ricardo Sá Pinto (May 29, 2016 – September 23, 2016)
 Fathi Al-Jabal (October 11, 2016 – October 14, 2019)
 Yannick Ferrera (October 14, 2019 – January 9, 2022)
 Georgios Donis (January 9, 2022 – )

References

External links

  

 
Fateh
Fateh
Fateh
Fateh
Fateh